Asahina (written:  or ) is a Japanese surname, which means "sunny place". Notable people with the surname include:

People
, a Japanese clan during the Sengoku period
, Japanese voice actress
, Japanese long-distance runner
, 20th century Rinzai Zen monk
, Japanese entomologist
, Japanese conductor
, Japanese lichenologist and chemist
 Asahina Yasutomo (1538–?), officer under the Imagawa clan
, (also known as Asahina Saburō) Japanese warrior of the early 13th century, and son of Wada Yoshimori
, Japanese manga author and artist

Fictional characters
 from Tokimeki Memorial
, character from Hatsune Miku: Colorful Stage!
, character from Magical☆Shopping Arcade Abenobashi
, character from RahXephon
, character from Junjo Romantica
, character from Diamond Daydreams
, mother of Mirai Asahina from Witchy PreCure!
, father of Mirai Asahina
, character from The Melancholy of Haruhi Suzumiya
, character from Haunted Junction
, character from Suzuka
, character from Danganronpa
, character from Danganronpa
, character from Brothers Conflict
, character from Brothers Conflict
, character from Brothers Conflict
, character from Brothers Conflict
, character from Brothers Conflict
, character from Brothers Conflict
, character from Brothers Conflict
, character from Brothers Conflict
, character from Brothers Conflict
, character from Brothers Conflict
, character from Brothers Conflict
, character from Brothers Conflict
, character from Brothers Conflict
, character from Brothers Conflict
, character from Kagerou Project
, character from Sket Dance
, character from Maho Girls PreCure!

See also
5230 Asahina, a main-belt asteroid

References

Japanese-language surnames